Amalgamated zinc is zinc that has been surface treated with mercury to form a surface amalgam containing little contamination from other elements. It is typically used for reduction, and is written as Zn(Hg) in reactions.

Applications 
 Used from ~1837 to reduce 'local action' which degraded operation of Voltaic piles. See History of the battery#Invention.
 To chemically reduce metallic ions in solution. See Jones reductor.
To reduce ketones and aldehydes to alkanes via the Clemmensen reduction in acidic conditions.

References

Electrochemistry
Metallurgy
Zinc alloys
Mercury (element)
Amalgams